The Roman Catholic Archdiocese of Brazzaville is the Metropolitan See for the Ecclesiastical province of Brazzaville in the Republic of the Congo.

History
On 4 June 1886, Pope Leo XIII established the Apostolic Vicariate of French Congo from the Diocese of São Paulo de Loanda in Angola and the Apostolic Vicariate of Two Guineas in Gabon.  It was renamed as the Apostolic Vicariate of Upper French Congo
on 14 October 1890, and again on 14 June 1922 as the Apostolic Vicariate of Brazzaville. It lost territory in 1950 when the Apostolic Vicariate of Fort-Rousset was established.  Pope Pius XII promoted the vicariate to the Metropolitan Archdiocese of Brazzaville on 14 September 1955.  It lost territory again in 1987 when the Diocese of Kinkala was established.

On May 30, 2020, the dioceses of Owando and Pointe-Noire  were raised to metropolitan archdioceses, and consequently the province of Brazzaville was split into 3 provinces.

Special churches
The seat of the archbishop is the Cathédrale Sacré-Coeur in Brazzaville, founded in 1887 by Monseigneur Augouard.

Bishops

Ordinaries
 Vicar Apostolic of French Congo  
Antoine-Marie-Hippolyte Carrie, C.S.Sp. 1886.06.08 – 1890.10.14, appointed Vicar Apostolic of Lower French Congo {Congo Francese Inferiore}
 Vicar Apostolic of Upper French Congo (Roman rite) 
Prosper Philippe Augouard, C.S.Sp. 1890.10.14 – 1921.10.03
 Vicars Apostolic of Brazzaville  
Firmin-Jules Guichard, C.S.Sp. 1922.06.12 – 1936.04.27
Paul Joseph Biéchy, C.S.Sp. 1936.01.27 – 1954
Michel-Jules-Joseph-Marie Bernard, C.S.Sp. 1954.07.18 – 1955.09.14; see below
 Metropolitan Archbishops of Brazzaville 
Michel-Jules-Joseph-Marie Bernard, C.S.Sp. 1955.09.14 – 1964.05.02; see above
Théophile Mbemba 1964.05.23 – 1971.06.14
Emile Biayenda 1971.06.14 – 1977.03.23 (Cardinal in 1973)
Barthélémy Batantu 1978.11.15 – 2001.01.23
Anatole Milandou since 2001.01.23

Coadjutor archbishops
Théophile Mbemba (1961-1964)
Émile Biayenda (1970-1971); later cardinal
Bienvenu Manamika Bafouakouahou (18 April 2020 – present)

Auxiliary bishop
Anatole Milandou (1983-1987), appointed Bishop of Kinkala (later returned here as Archbishop)

Other priest of this diocese who became bishop
Urbain Ngassongo, appointed Bishop of Gamboma in 2013

Suffragan Dioceses
Gamboma
Kinkala

See also
 Roman Catholicism in the Republic of the Congo
 List of Roman Catholic dioceses in the Republic of the Congo

Sources

Bibliography
 Maria Petringa, Brazza, A Life for Africa, Bloomington, IN:  AuthorHouse, 2006, 

Organisations based in Brazzaville
Roman Catholic dioceses in the Republic of the Congo
Religious organizations established in 1886
Roman Catholic dioceses and prelatures established in the 19th century
A